Mallory Weggemann (born March 26, 1989) is an American Paralympic swimmer.

Career
She became a T10-complete paraplegic after an epidural injection to treat post-shingles back pain in 2008. She broke many world records in the S7 classification, and won multiple gold medals at the IPC Swimming World Championships in 2009 and 2010. At the 2012 Paralympics, she was controversially reclassified to S8, a class for swimmers with less impairment. She won the S8 50 metre freestyle event in a new Paralympic record time.

Just under four months after becoming paralyzed Mallory was back in the pool, with her eyes on gold at the 2012 Paralympic Games. Having achieved that goal, she decided it was time to chase her dream, to walk again. For years, this was something that was deemed impossible, but a new possibility arose and in order to achieve her goal, Mallory reached out to the public to ask for their support through a crowd funding Indiegogo campaign. On November 16, 2013, Mallory was able to "walk" again for the first time in nearly six years, with the aid of customized leg braces and forearm crutches. 

Weggemann trained for the 2016 Paralympic Games in Rio de Janeiro, Brazil and actively building upon her career outside of the pool through motivational speaking. Mallory was featured in "The Current," a documentary produced by Make A Hero, a non-profit organization focused on inspiring individuals with disabilities to enjoy the freedom of adaptive sports.

In June 2021 the US announced the 34 Paralympic swimmers who would be going to the delayed 2020 Summer Paralympics in Tokyo. The women's team was Weggemann, Jessica Long, McKenzie Coan, Rebecca Meyers and Elizabeth Marks. Weggmann would go on to win several medals and break two records during the Tokyo Games.

On April 14, 2022, Weggemann was named to the roster to represent the United States at the 2022 World Para Swimming Championships.

Honors and awards
 World Disabled Swimmer of the Year - 2009, 2010
 USA Swimming Disabled Swimmer of the Year (Trischa L. Zorn Award) - 2009, 2010, 2011
 Best Female Athlete with a Disability ESPY Award - 2011

Personal life

She lives in Eagan, Minnesota.

References

External links
 
 
 
 Athlete swimming to greatness after paralysis
 Mallory Weggemann on Trans World Sport
 Mallory Weggemann - "Triumph over Tragedy" TEDx UNPlaza
 Mallory Weggemann - "The Journey of New Mobility" Part 1
 ERM Speaking Engagement

1989 births
Living people
American disabled sportspeople
American female freestyle swimmers
S8-classified Paralympic swimmers
Paralympic swimmers of the United States
Paralympic gold medalists for the United States
Paralympic silver medalists for the United States
Paralympic bronze medalists for the United States
Paralympic medalists in swimming
Swimmers at the 2012 Summer Paralympics
Swimmers at the 2016 Summer Paralympics
Swimmers at the 2020 Summer Paralympics
Medalists at the 2012 Summer Paralympics
Medalists at the 2020 Summer Paralympics
Medalists at the 2015 Parapan American Games
American people of German descent
Medalists at the World Para Swimming Championships
People with paraplegia
World record holders in paralympic swimming
Sportspeople from Lawrence, Kansas
People from Eagan, Minnesota
University of Minnesota alumni
21st-century American women
American female medley swimmers